Joseph Brandt may refer to:

 Joseph Brant (1743–1807), Mohawk military and political leader
 Joseph A. Brandt (1899–1985), president of the University of Oklahoma
 Józef Brandt (1841–1915), Polish painter